Talmenka is an urban locality (work settlement) and the administrative center of Talmensky District of Altai Krai, Russia. Population:

References

Notes

Sources

Urban-type settlements in Altai Krai